Joshua Veivers is a professional rugby league player, currently contracted to Salford City Reds in the Super League. The son of former St. Helens player, and Salford City Reds coach Phil Veivers, Josh Veivers joined the Wakefield Trinity Wildcats from Wigan Warriors, where he made no first team appearances, only playing in their academy.

References

1989 births
Living people
English rugby league players
Ipswich Jets players
Rugby league fullbacks
Rugby league wingers
Salford Red Devils players
Josh
Wakefield Trinity players
Whitehaven R.L.F.C. players